Franklin Township was one of nine townships in Johnson County, Indiana. As of the 2010 census, its population was 20,685 and it contained 8,503 housing units. Lydia J. Wales was elected as Franklin Township Trustee and began serving her first term on January 1, 2015 and was reelected to a second term beginning on January 1, 2019.  

As of January 1, 2022, Franklin, Union, and Needham townships were merged into a single entity known as Franklin-Union-Needham Township ("FUN").

History
Hopewell Presbyterian Church and Van Nuys Farm are listed on the National Register of Historic Places. The Franklin Township Trustee's office was relocated to 20 Circle Drive in Franklin in 2019. The trustee's office is primarily tasked with poor relief and fire protection for unincorporated areas within the township.

Geography

References

External links

 Indiana Township Association
 United Township Association of Indiana
https://www.franklintownshiptrustee.org/

Townships in Johnson County, Indiana
Townships in Indiana